A perpetual motion machine is a hypothetical machine that can do work indefinitely without an energy source.

Perpetual Motion Machine may also refer to:
 "Perpetual Motion Machine", a song by Klaatu from the album Sir Army Suit
 "Perpetual Motion Machine", a song by Modest Mouse from the album No One's First, and You're Next